Aisin Gioro Yiwei (隱志郡王 奕緯; 16 May 1808 – 23 May 1831) was Qing dynasty imperial prince as Daoguang Emperor's first son. As the eldest emperor's son, he was an heir presumptive until his death. Though he was not granted a title of a crown prince, he was made the first Prince Yinzhi of the Second Rank. As the peerage was not granted iron-cap status, each subsequent successor would hold diminished ranks no lower than feng'en fuguo gong.

Life 
Yiwei was born to a maid in the residence of Minning, lady Hoifa Nara. His mother was later promoted to a position of secondary consort. In 1822, his mother was granted a title of Concubine He. Before lady Hoifa Nara was granted honorifical name, she had been addressed as "Her Highness Second Concubine", because she had been receiving a treatment befitting imperial concubine as a secondary consort.

In 1816, Yiwei was granted a title of the prince of the third rank by the Jiaqing Emperor. Since 1821, Yiwei has been an heir presumptive to the imperial throne as the emperor's eldest son despite he was not appointed as Crown Prince. Another reason why Yiwei was taken into consideration as a potential successor, was beautiful appearance. Yiwei was neither exceptionally well-versed in literature and martial arts nor showed diligence in the studies. One day, after he was reprimanded by a teacher, he told that if he had been an emperor, he would have killed the teacher. This deeply enraged the Daoguang Emperor, who spanked the prince and ordered him to return to his study to reflect on himself. As Yiwei was injured, eunuchs took him away and closed in the Third South Study.

In 1825, Yiwei organised Grand Sacrificial Ceremonies together with his paternal uncle Miankai. In 1830, Yiwei was once again sent to conduct sacrifices together with his fifth paternal uncle, Mianyu.

Yiwei died on 23 May 1831 in the Old Summer Palace of illness. The cause of his death became debatable subject among scholars. Official Qing dynasty records briefly mention that Yiwei was sent for recuperation and do not mention the diagnosis. It was suggested that careless and delayed treatment done by imperial doctors caused the death. Daoguang Emperor was shocked over the abrupt death of his son. When the funeral was organised in the Wuying hall in the Forbidden City, Daoguang Emperor suddenly left it. His studio was abandoned for 17 years and was later given as a residence of Yizhu and Yixin. Yiwei was posthumously granted a title of Yinzhi beile (多罗隐志贝勒, meaning "profoundly aspiring"). In 1850, he was posthumously promoted to Prince Yinzhi of the Second Rank (隐志郡王)

Family 
Yiwei was married to lady Gūwalgiya, daughter of duke Yinghai (英海) since 1822. His primary consort died in 1827. He married later lady Ulanghan, daughter of sixth rank literary official Lude (禄德).

Primary Consort

 First primary consort, of the Gūwalgiya clan (嫡福晋 瓜尔佳氏, d. 1827) 皇长子嫡福晋-->隐志贝勒嫡夫人-->隐志郡王嫡福晋
 Second primary consort, of the Ulanghan clan (继福晋 乌朗罕氏, d. 1871)  皇长子侧福晋-->皇长子继福晋-->隐志贝勒继夫人-->隐志郡王继福晋

Concubine

 Mistress, of an unknown clan (庶福晋 某氏) 皇长子庶福晋-->隐志贝勒妾-->隐志郡王庶福晋

Adopted son: Zaizhi (载治, 14 February 1839 - 27 January 1881), son of defender general Yiji (from Prince Xun (循) peerage) and mistress, lady Shen

References

Qing dynasty imperial princes
Daoguang Emperor's sons